Wickenburg Municipal Airport  is a public use airport located  west of the central business district of Wickenburg, in Maricopa County, Arizona, United States. It is owned by the Town of Wickenburg. According to the FAA's National Plan of Integrated Airport Systems for 2009–2013, it is categorized as a general aviation facility.

Facilities and aircraft 
It has one runway designated 5/23 with an asphalt surface measuring 6,100 by 75 feet (1,859 x 23 m).

For the 12-month period ending April 28, 2009, the airport had 50,400 aircraft operations, an average of 138 per day: 99% general aviation and 1% air taxi. At that time there were 52 aircraft based at this airport: 84% single-engine, 9% multi-engine, 2% jet and 4% helicopter.

References

External links 
 Wickenburg Municipal (E25) at Arizona DOT
 Aerial image as of 24 May 1997 from USGS The National Map
 

Airports in Maricopa County, Arizona